Piero Mingoia (born 20 October 1991) is an English former professional footballer who played as an attacking midfielder.

He began his career with Watford, and spent time on loan at Brentford, Hayes & Yeading United, Accrington Stanley and Boreham Wood before joining Accrington Stanley in 2013. He subsequently joined Cambridge United, before returning to Accrington, where he was loaned to Morecambe. He last played for National League side Boreham Wood.

Career

Watford
Mingoia was born in Enfield, London He joined Watford at the age of 13 and rose through the ranks. He signed professional terms towards the end of the 2009–10 season, penning a one-year deal following the conclusion of his two-year scholarship. He marked his full debut on 8 January 2011 against Hartlepool United in the FA Cup with a fine goal, curling in from 25 yards. Watford went on to win the game 4–1.

He made his league debut for Watford in the 3–0 home win against Derby County a week later, as an 81st-minute substitute for Marvin Sordell. Mingoia made four more appearances during the 2010–11 season and was rewarded with a two-year contract extension.

Mingoia joined Brentford on loan for a month on 5 January 2012. He took no part in any matchday squad for the club, and returned to Watford a week before his loan spell was due to end. Mingoia joined Hayes & Yeading United on loan on 22 March for one month.

Mingoia joined League Two side Accrington Stanley on an initial month's loan in September 2012. This was extended for a further three months in October, keeping Mingoia at Stanley until January 2013. On 31 January 2013, he joined Boreham Wood on loan until the end of the season, stating that he "wanted to go back to basics and enjoy playing football again".

Watford released Mingoia when his contract expired at the end of the 2012–13 season.

Accrington Stanley
Mingoia returned to Accrington Stanley to sign a one-year contract on 1 August 2013. On 22 January 2014, Mingoia signed a new contract extension to keep him contracted until the summer of 2015.

Cambridge United

Mingoia signed a two-year deal with Cambridge United on 2 June 2016. He scored on his debut in a 1–1 draw with Barnet on 6 August 2016.

He left the club at the end of the 2017–18 season.

Second spell at Accrington
On 27 June 2018, Mingoia returned to Accrington Stanley on a two-year deal.

Morecambe (loan)
On 31 January 2019, Mingoia joined Morecambe on loan until the end of the season.

Boreham Wood
On 1 July 2019, Mingoia joined Boreham Wood on a free transfer. He was released by the club in June 2021.

Career statistics

References

External links

1991 births
Living people
Footballers from Enfield, London
English footballers
Association football midfielders
Watford F.C. players
Brentford F.C. players
Hayes & Yeading United F.C. players
Accrington Stanley F.C. players
Cambridge United F.C. players
Boreham Wood F.C. players
Morecambe F.C. players
English Football League players
National League (English football) players